Karl Guthe Jansky (October 22, 1905 – February 14, 1950) was an American physicist and radio engineer who in April 1933 first announced his discovery of radio waves emanating from the Milky Way in the constellation Sagittarius. He is considered one of the founding figures of radio astronomy.

Early life 

Karl Guthe Jansky was born 1905 in what was then the Territory of Oklahoma where his father, Cyril M. Jansky, was Dean of the College of Engineering at the University of Oklahoma at Norman. Cyril M. Jansky, born in Wisconsin of Czech immigrants, had started teaching at the age of sixteen. He was a teacher throughout his active life, retiring as Professor of Electrical Engineering at the University of Wisconsin.  He was an engineer with a strong interest in physics, a trait passed on to his sons.  Karl Jansky was named after Dr. Karl Eugen Guthe, a Professor of Physics at the University of Michigan who had been an important mentor to Cyril M. Jansky.

Karl Jansky's mother, born Nellie Moreau, was of French and English descent.  Karl's brother Cyril Jansky Jr., who was ten years older, helped build some of the earliest radio transmitters in the country, including 9XM in Wisconsin (now WHA of Wisconsin Public Radio) and 9XI in Minnesota (now KUOM).

Karl Jansky attended college at the University of Wisconsin where he received his BS in physics in 1927. He stayed an extra year at Madison, completing all the graduate course work for a Masters degree in physics except for the thesis. In July 1928 at age 22, he was able to join the Bell Telephone Laboratories, and because of a kidney condition he had since college (which eventually led to his early death), he was sent to the healthier environs of the field station in Holmdel, New Jersey. Bell Labs wanted to investigate atmospheric and ionospheric properties using "short waves" (wavelengths of about 10–20 meters) for use in trans-Atlantic radio telephone service. As a radio engineer, Jansky was assigned the job of investigating sources of static that might interfere with radio voice transmissions.

Radio astronomy 

At Bell Telephone Laboratories, Jansky built a directional antenna designed to receive radio waves at a frequency of 20.5 MHz (wavelength about 14.6 meters). It had a diameter of approximately 100 ft. (30 meter) and stood 20 ft. (6 meter) tall. It was mounted on top of a turntable on a set of four Ford Model-T wheels, which allowed it to be rotated in the azimuthal direction, earning it the nickname "Jansky's merry-go-round" (the cost of which was later estimated to be less than $1000).  By rotating the antenna, the direction of a received signal could be pinpointed. The intensity of the signal was recorded by an analog pen-and-paper recording system housed in a small shed to the side of the antenna.

After recording signals from all directions for several months, Jansky eventually categorized them into three types of static: nearby thunderstorms, distant thunderstorms, and a faint static or "hiss" of unknown origin. He spent over a year investigating the source of the third type of static. The location of maximum intensity rose and fell once a day, leading Jansky to initially surmise that he was detecting radiation from the Sun.

After a few months of following the signal, however, the point of maximum static moved away from the position of the Sun. Jansky also determined that the signal repeated on a cycle of 23 hours and 56 minutes. Jansky discussed the puzzling phenomena with his friend, astrophysicist Albert Melvin Skellett, who pointed out that the observed time between the signal peaks was the exact length of a sidereal day; the time it took for "fixed" astronomical objects, such as a star, to pass in front of the antenna every time the Earth rotated. By comparing his observations with optical astronomical maps, Jansky concluded that the radiation was coming from the Milky Way and was strongest (7:10 p.m. on September 16, 1932) in the direction of the center of the galaxy, in the constellation of Sagittarius.

Jansky announced his discovery at a meeting in Washington D.C. in April 1933 to a small audience who could not comprehend its significance. His discovery was widely publicized, appearing in the New York Times of May 5, 1933, and he was interviewed on a special NBC program on "Radio sounds from among the stars". In October 1933, his discovery was published in a journal article entitled "Electrical disturbances apparently of extraterrestrial origin" in the Proceedings of the Institute of Radio Engineers.

If the radio sources were from the stars, the Sun should also be producing radio noise, but Jansky found that it did not. In the early 1930s, the Sun was at an inactive phase in its sunspot cycle. In 1935 Jansky made the suggestion that the strange radio signals may be produced from interstellar gas, in particular, by "thermal agitation of charged particles." Jansky accomplished these investigations while still in his twenties with a bachelor's degree in physics.

Jansky wanted to further investigate the Milky Way radio waves after 1935 (he called the radiation "Star Noise" in the thesis he submitted to earn his 1936 University of Wisconsin Masters degree), but he found little support from either astronomers, for whom it was completely foreign, or Bell Labs, which could not justify, during the depression, the cost of research on a phenomenon that did not significantly affect trans-Atlantic communications systems.

Follow-up 
Several scientists were interested in Jansky's discovery, but radio astronomy remained a dormant field for several years, due in part to Jansky's lack of formal training as an astronomer. His discovery had come in the midst of the Great Depression, and observatories were wary of taking on any new and potentially risky projects.

Two men who learned of Jansky's 1933 discovery were of great influence on the later development of the new study of radio astronomy:  one was Grote Reber, a radio engineer who singlehandedly built a radio telescope in his Illinois back yard in 1937 and did the first systematic survey of astronomical radio waves. The second was John D. Kraus, who, after World War II, started a radio observatory at Ohio State University and wrote a textbook on radio astronomy, long considered a standard by radio astronomers.

Death and legacy 

 

Jansky was a resident of Little Silver, New Jersey, and died at age 44 in a Red Bank, New Jersey, hospital (now called Riverview Medical Center) due to a heart condition.

In honor of Jansky, the unit used by radio astronomers for the spectral irradiance of radio sources is the jansky (1 Jy = 10−26 W⋅m−2⋅Hz−1).  The crater Jansky on the Moon is also named after him. The National Radio Astronomy Observatory (NRAO) postdoctoral fellowship program is named after Karl Jansky. Additionally, NRAO awards the Jansky Prize annually in Jansky's honor.  On January 10, 2012, the NRAO announced the Very Large Array (VLA), the radio telescope in Magdalena, New Mexico, would be renamed the Karl G. Jansky Very Large Array in honor of Karl Jansky's contribution to radio astronomy.

A full-scale replica of Jansky's original rotating telescope is located on the grounds of the Green Bank Observatory (formerly an NRAO site) in Green Bank, West Virginia, near a reconstructed version of Grote Reber's 9-meter dish.

The original site of Jansky's antenna  at what is now the Bell Labs Holmdel Complex at 101 Crawfords Corner Road, Holmdel, New Jersey, was determined by Tony Tyson and Robert Wilson of Lucent Technologies (the successor of Bell Telephone Laboratories) in 1998, and a monument and plaque were placed there to honor the achievement. The monument is a stylized sculpture of the antenna and is oriented as Jansky's antenna was at 7:10 p.m. on September 16, 1932, at a moment of maximum signal caused by alignment with the center of our galaxy in the direction of the constellation Sagittarius.

Jansky noise is named after Jansky, and refers to high frequency static disturbances of cosmic origin. (Cosmic noise).

Asteroid 1932 Jansky is named after him, as is the lunar crater Jansky.

Selected writings 
 
 
  Reprinted 65 years later as  along with an explanatory preface by W.A. Imbriale, .

See also
Reber Radio Telescope
Astronomical radio source
Radio Astronomy

References 

. In particular Chap.1 by Sullivan, "Karl Jansky and the discovery of extraterrestrial radio waves," pp. 3–42.
. In particular Chap. 2.

External links 

My Brother Karl Jansky and His Discovery of Radio Waves from Beyond the Earth

Serendipitous Discoveries in Radio Astronomy: Proceedings of a Workshop held at the National Radio Astronomy Observatory, Green Bank, West Virginia on May 4, 5, 6,1983; Honoring the 50th Anniversary Announcing the Discovery of Cosmic Radio Waves by Karl G. Jansky on May 5, 1933. Edited by K. Kellermann and B. Sheets (1983) 321pp

 Encyclopedia of Oklahoma History and Culture – Jansky, Karl
Detective Work Leads to Monument Honoring the Father of Radio Astronomy — Radio Astronomy Celebration at NOKIA Bell Labs

1905 births
1950 deaths
Amateur astronomers
American astronomers
20th-century American physicists
American people of Czech descent
American people of English descent
American people of French descent
Czech-American culture in Oklahoma
People from Little Silver, New Jersey
People from Norman, Oklahoma
Scientists at Bell Labs
Radio astronomers
American electrical engineers
Engineers from New Jersey
20th-century American engineers